WBON is a radio station (98.5 FM) licensed to Westhampton, New York, United States. It may also refer to the following broadcasting stations in the United States:

WBON-LD, a low-power television station (channel 9) licensed to serve Richmond, Kentucky, United States
WLIR-FM, a radio station (107.1 FM) licensed to Hampton Bays, New York, which held the call sign WBON from 2003 to 2004
WKHT, a radio station (104.5 FM) licensed to Knoxville, Tennessee, which held the call sign WBON from 2000 to 2003
WVCY-FM, a radio station (107.7 FM) licensed to Milwaukee, Wisconsin, which held the call sign WBON from 1964 to 1973